George Denison Faber, 1st Baron Wittenham, CB, DL (14 December 1852 – 1 February 1931), known as Denison Faber, was a Conservative Party politician in the United Kingdom.

Background and early life
Faber was the second surviving son of Charles Wilson Faber (1813–1878) a director of the Great Northern Railway and the nephew of Lord Grimthorpe. He was the brother of Edmund Faber, 1st Baron Faber, and of Mrs Edward Kennard (1850–1936), a novelist.

He was educated at the University of Oxford, where he graduated BA, and in 1879 was called to the Bar at Lincoln's Inn. From 1887 to 1896 he acted as Registrar of the Privy Council.

Political career

Faber was elected a Member of Parliament (MP) for York in a by-election on 6 February 1900, following the resignation of Lord Charles Beresford. He served until January 1910, when he lost his seat, and was again elected for Clapham from 1910 to 1918.

He was appointed a Companion of the Order of the Bath in 1905.

On 29 June 1918, he was elevated to the peerage as Baron Wittenham, of Wallingford in the County of Berkshire.

Personal life
Faber married, in 1895, Hilda Georgina Graham, youngest daughter of Sir Frederick Graham, 3rd Baronet, of Netherby in Cumberland, and granddaughter of the 12th Duke of Somerset. The marriage was childless.
He purchased Howbery Park, a mid-19th century house near Wallingford.

He died on 1 February 1931, aged 78, when the barony became extinct. He is buried with his brother Edmund in Brompton Cemetery in London. The monument is currently (2014) concealed behind shrubbery on the east side of the main entrance path from the north but has had a low tunnel created through which it may be viewed.

References

External links 
 

Wittenham, George Faber, 1st Baron
Wittenham, George Faber, 1st Baron
Wittenham, George Faber, 1st Baron
Conservative Party (UK) MPs for English constituencies
Wittenham, George Faber, 1st Baron
UK MPs 1900–1906
UK MPs 1906–1910
UK MPs 1910
UK MPs 1910–1918
UK MPs who were granted peerages
Wittenham, George Faber, 1st Baron
Barons created by George V